Baron Gyula Bornemisza de Kászon et Impérfalva (Bornemissza; 16 December 1873 – 30 December 1925) was a Hungarian aristocrat and diplomat.

Life and career
Gyula Bornemisza was born into an old Transylvanian noble family of Székely origin, as one of the six children of royal and imperial chamberlain Baron Tivadar Bornemisza (1843–1902) and Baroness Róza Jósika. Gyula and one of his brothers, János studied at the Jesuit school of Stella Matutina in Feldkirch, then the Kalksburg College in Vienna.

In 1919 he was part of the counter-revolutionary government (firstly formed in Arad) under the leadership of Count Gyula Károlyi, which was established to oppose the Hungarian Soviet Republic. In this government he was Minister of Foreign Affairs from 5 May to 31 May. Along with other members of the government, Bornemisza was interned by Romanian authorities to Mezőhegyes between 9 May and 22 May, during the Romanian intervention in Hungary.

In 1920 he became envoy to the embassy of the Imperial Family-in-exile in Switzerland, the actual representation of Hungary in Switzerland. From November 1920 he also officially became the head of the Hungarian diplomatic mission in Switzerland. This he remained until March 1921.

Bornemisza was married to Klára Bethlen de Bethlen at Sarn bei Brixen in 1912, with whom he had four sons and a daughter.

References

1873 births
1925 deaths
Politicians from Cluj-Napoca
Hungarian nobility in Transylvania
Ambassadors of Hungary to Switzerland
Foreign ministers of Hungary
Diplomats from Cluj-Napoca